Simon Buckmaster (born 15 January 1961) is a British former professional Grand Prix motorcycle racer. He participated in 50 Grands Prix races between 1984 and 1992. His best season was in 1989 when he finished 12th in the Championship.

Career
Buckmaster made his first Grand Prix appearance at the British Grand Prix at Silverstone in 1983, but failed to qualify. He returned in 1984 and successfully qualified for the race. Buckmaster became a Grand Prix regular in 1985. Riding a privateer Suzuki he made five starts but scored no championship points. In 1986 Buckmaster switched to Honda and competed in all of the races. His best finish was 15th place at the Dutch TT. Buckmaster continued to ride a Honda in 1987 season, starting in 12 races but failing to score any points.

Buckmaster had a career-best season in 1989 when he finished 12th in the Championship. He had a career-best race at the Nations Grand Prix at Misano which most of the top riders boycotted for safety reasons, allowing Buckmaster to score his highest finish with a second behind Pierfrancesco Chili. Buckmaster competed at the highest level of Grand Prix racing until 1992.

He was severely injured at the 1993 Bol d'Or when he collided with rider Michel Graziano. The crash ended Buckmaster's racing career as his lower left leg had to be amputated.

After his riding career, Buckmaster became a team manager, currently with the PTR Honda team in the Supersport World Championship.

Career statistics

Grand Prix motorcycle racing

Races by year
(key) (Races in bold indicate pole position) (Races in italics indicate fastest lap)

Superbike World Championship

Races by year
(key) (Races in bold indicate pole position) (Races in italics indicate fastest lap)

References

External links
Simon Buckmaster – Profile at the official MotoGP website

Living people
1961 births
British motorcycle racers
500cc World Championship riders
Superbike World Championship riders